The 1999 Eastern Michigan Eagles football team represented Eastern Michigan University in the 1999 NCAA Division I-A football season. In their fifth and final season under head coach Rick Rasnick, the Eagles compiled a 4–7 record (4–4 against conference opponents), finished in fourth place in the West Division of the Mid-American Conference, and were outscored by their opponents, 338 to 239. The team's statistical leaders included Walter Church with 2,015 passing yards, Eric Powell with 583 rushing yards, and Brandon Campbell with 764 receiving yards. Donald "Blake" McCall received the team's most valuable player award.

Schedule

References

Eastern Michigan
Eastern Michigan Eagles football seasons
Eastern Michigan Eagles football